Providence Catholic High School (often referred to as Providence, Provi, or abbreviated PCHS) is a Roman Catholic secondary school located in New Lenox, Illinois.  Located in the Roman Catholic Diocese of Joliet, Providence Catholic is a private school run by the Order of Saint Augustine and is a member of the Augustinian Secondary Education Association..

The school is located at the crossroads of Lincoln Highway (also part of U.S. Highway 30) and Interstate 80.

History
Providence Catholic High School began as St. Mary Academy for Girls, a commercial school in Joliet, Illinois run by the Sisters of Loretto.  The school opened in 1880, though the original building was not opened until 1883.  Eventually, academic classes were added.

In 1918, the Archdiocese of Chicago invited the Sisters of Providence to take over the school. On October 22 of that year, the school's name was changed to Providence High School.  In 1931, the academic classes were stopped as the Great Depression took its toll on the school.  In 1932, the school reverted to a two-year commercial school.  A four-year secretarial program opened in 1938.  Though the academic courses were reinstated after the Depression, the school building was condemned as a fire hazard in 1959 and demolished.  From 1959 through 1962, the school met at St. Mary Nativity Elementary School.  When the old building was demolished, it is said that students sifted through the wreckage looking for bricks that were not crushed. They wrapped the bricks and sold them as souvenirs to help build the new Providence.

In 1962, the modern Providence High School was opened.  The most obvious change was location:  the school had left Joliet and was now located a few miles to the east in New Lenox.  The other major change was the shift to a coed school.  Though Providence was a relatively new school, the community of New Lenox was not heavily populated then.  Enrollment decreased, and the school began suffering financially.  Father Roger Kaffer (later Bishop Kaffer) was named the new principal and arrived in 1970.  He began a campaign to improve the academic standing of the school and the transportation options for students traveling great distances. It was his practice to visit every family that had a child enrolled in the school.  The 1971 enrollment was 490; by 1975, it had reached 785.  Growth during the late 1970s and early 1980s made additions to the school building necessary.

The Province of Our Mother of Good Counsel, the Midwest U.S. province of the Order of Saint Augustine, was invited by the diocese to take control of the school after the 1984–85 school year.  A college preparatory curriculum was added, as was a refocus on the spiritual mission of the school.  The religious studies course work was upgraded, and a retreat program was begun.  The name of the school was changed to "Providence Catholic High School" in 1985 to reflect these changes.  In 1998, the school decided to limit enrollment in order to retain a more personal atmosphere with students. The school has added 55,000 square feet to the original building with the addition of a science and fine arts wing in 2002 and a Student Commons Addition in 2018.  Today the school sits on 75 acres with three campuses.  In 2018 the school celebrated its 100th Anniversary as Providence Catholic High School.

Academics
Providence is a college preparatory school, and uses a weighted grading system.

The school offers eighteen Advanced Placement courses: English Language, English Literature, Statistics, Calculus (AB), Calculus (BC), Biology, U.S. History, U.S. Government & Politics, European History, Psychology, Spanish Language, Music Theory, Advanced Placement Computer Science and Studio Art.

Student life

Clubs & Activities
The marching band started their first competitive season in 2006 and since then, had received awards and recognition in several fields in local/regional, state, and national competitions such as Bands of America. They also have performed at the halftime show of the 2010 Outback Bowl. The marching band placed in states competition in their classification for the first time in the school's history at Illinois State University in class 2A in 2019. For the 2020-2021 school year, with several closures and cancellations of on-site competitions due to COVID-19, the marching band participated through virtual competitions that were hosted through USBands and The Cavaliers GearWORKS. In October 31, 2020, the marching band placed 1st for the state of Illinois in class 1A through USBands. In November 7, 2020, they placed 3rd place in the nation in class 1A with first place in the Visual caption and overall Midwest Regional Champions. In the 2021 marching band season, the band placed 2nd in States in class 2A and made school history by performing in Finals for the first time at ISU placing 15th.

The winter guard first started their competitive program in 2002, in which they compete in the MidWest Color Guard Circuit (also known as MWCGC, a local circuit that uses the WGI competing format, and utilizes several similar competing rules and regulations), where they currently are in class SRA. During the 2021 season, they competed virtually through the MidWest Color Guard Circuit, MAIN through USBands, and WGI. They ended their season with an Excellent rating through MAIN, silver medal for beginner soloist performance, and a gold medal through MWCGC. The choir, jazz, and concert band departments performs in performances through ILMEA, IHSA, Midwest Music Festival, and Music for All in which they have several awards and medals for both groups and solo performances.

Athletics
Providence Catholic High School holds a record 31 team state championships.  No other private High School in Illinois has more. The Providence Celtics compete in two conferences.  Men's teams compete in the Chicago Catholic League (CCL), while the women compete in the Girls Catholic Athletic Conference (GCAC).  Providence competes in state tournaments sponsored by the Illinois High School Association (IHSA).

The school sponsors teams for men and women in basketball, cross country, golf, soccer, tennis, track & field, and volleyball.  Men may also compete in baseball, bowling, football, lacrosse and wrestling.  Women may compete in cheerleading, dance and softball. In 2016, the hockey team won their second Kennedy Cup.

Providence Catholic Children's Academy
The school also houses the Providence Catholic Children's Academy, which is for ages 3–5.  Three- and four-year-olds may partake in half-day preschool classes, while five-year-olds may take full-day kindergarten.

Notable alumni
Pete Bercich (class of 1990) was an NFL linebacker who spent his entire career (1995–98, 2000) with the Minnesota Vikings
 Miles Boykin (class of 2015), wide receiver for the Pittsburgh Steelers
Tavaras Hardy (class of 1998), Head Basketball Coach University of Loyola Maryland
Yvette Healy (class of 1995), Head Softball Coach University of Wisconsin-Madison
Carmen Pignatiello (class of 2000) was a Major League Baseball pitcher who has pitched for the Chicago Cubs (2008).
Bryan Rekar (class of 1990) was a Major League Baseball pitcher (1995–2002).
 Eric Steinbach (class of 1998) was an NFL offensive guard who played for the Cincinnati Bengals and Cleveland Browns
 Sam Travis (class of 2011), first baseman for the Boston Red Sox
 Brad Guzan (class of 2003) is a goalkeeper who has played for Chivas USA and now Atlanta United of Major League Soccer, the US National Team, Aston Villa and Middlesbrough the Premier League.

References

External links
 Providence Catholic Home Page
 Midwest Augustinians - Province of Our Mother of Good Counsel
 Order of St Augustine, International Homepage
 Text of the Rule of St. Augustine
 Augnet International Cooperative Web Site for Schools in the Tradition of St. Augustine

Roman Catholic Diocese of Joliet in Illinois
Catholic secondary schools in Illinois
Augustinian schools
Educational institutions established in 1880
Schools in Will County, Illinois
1880 establishments in Illinois